The Sooke Harbour House is an inn and restaurant located in Sooke, British Columbia, Canada, on the southern tip of Vancouver Island. It was one of the first restaurants to devote itself to local foods, having done so since 1979. It serves what is now called "West Coast Canadian Cuisine." This cuisine draws inspiration from the foods of the indigenous peoples of the region, the sea, and farmed products from within roughly 25 miles of the inn.

The Sooke Harbour House has been owned by Frederique and Sinclair Philip since 1979. Sinclair Philip is the Canadian representative to Slow Food in Italy and some years ago was a Slow Food Vancouver Island Convivium leader. Mr. Philip has a doctorate in political economics from the University of Grenoble in France. The head chef of the restaurant for nearly 15 years was Edward Tuson (he has recently opened his own property in Sooke called Black Market Meats). The head gardener of the kitchen gardens for over 13 years was Byron Cook. The kitchen team was for a time under Sam Benedetto (now Executive Chef at Zambri's) and then Robin Jackson took the lead role. The restaurant's chef now is Oliver Kienast. In 2000, a writer for The New York Times called the Sooke Harbour House "one of Canada's half-dozen best restaurants".

In May 2012, The Sooke Harbour House was put up for sale at $5.9 million. The Philips cited financial pressure from a decline in the tourism industry, along with stress, as the reasons for putting the inn up for sale. It ultimately did not sell. In 2015, it was reported that the Business Development Bank of Canada initiated a foreclosure action against the inn for owing $2.9 million on a mortgage from 1997. Denying that they were in foreclosure, the Philips eventually agreed with new investors to sell the property, pay back the mortgage, and begin expanding the property. However, this led to protracted legal battles between the Philips and the investors. Timothy Durkin, the investor, sued Frederique and Sinclair Philip for control of the business, which resulted in an interim order from a judge to the Philips to "immediately quit and leave the business premises". Amidst the ongoing legal battle for ownership, the Sooke Harbour House was put up for sale for $5.63 million in April 2020 as part of a foreclosure sale ordered by the courts.
 

In June, 2020, it was announced that real estate company IAG Enterprises would purchase the property for $5.6 million. IAG chief operating officer Alex Watson noted that the company wants to reopen Sooke Harbour House in 2021, after renovating different areas of the site.

In September 2020, after a 56-day trial, British Columbia Supreme Court Justice Jasvinder Basrann awarded Frederique and Sinclair Philip "more than $4 million for the 'six-year odyssey of lies, excuses, threats, intimidation and bullying' they suffered at the hands of Timothy Durkin and his partner Rodger Gregory." In a 94-page ruling, Justice Basran concluded the Philips' "reasonable expectation of a comfortable and well-deserved retirement has been effectively stolen from them because they unknowingly put their future in the hands of these two fundamentally dishonest individuals."  The Philip's attorney says his clients are unlikely to collect the $4 million in damages because "Durkin has no assets listed in his name—no car, no property, no Canadian bank account." Durkin filed a notice of his intent to appeal Basran’s decision. After the Philip's paid legal fees and lenders, and the federal, provincial, and municipal governments collected what was owed for late and unpaid taxes, the couple was left with nothing from the sale.

References

External links
Sooke Harbour House

Restaurants in British Columbia